Marco Antonio Palacios Redorta (born 6 March 1981), is a Mexican former footballer who last played for Monarcas Morelia on loan from Pumas UNAM.

He made his debut with the Club Universidad Nacional under-17 Squad at the age of 16 along with his twin brother Alejandro. He made his professional debut with Club Universidad Nacional (also known as Universidad Autonoma De Mexico, or U.N.A.M.) at age 21 sporting the jersey number 23, and made it through the ranks by 2004. In 2005, he was a regular starter in the Copa Sudamericana, but he lost his starting position in the regular league games. He has acquired two honors, that of Mexican "Torneo de Clausura" (Season Closure Tournament) (2004) and of Torneo de Apertura (2004).

Honors

UNAM
 Mexican Primera División: Clausura 2004, Apertura 2004, Clausura 2009, Clausura 2011
 Campeón de Campeones: 2004

External links

 

1981 births
Living people
Footballers from Mexico City
Club Universidad Nacional footballers
Atlético Morelia players
C.D. Veracruz footballers
Liga MX players
Mexican twins
Twin sportspeople
Mexican footballers
Association football defenders